This is a list of ports in Albania.

Main ports

Petroleum ports

Tourism ports

Gallery

References

 
Albania